Third St. Joseph County Courthouse is a historic courthouse located at South Bend, St. Joseph County, Indiana. It was designed by architecture firm Shepley, Rutan and Coolidge and built in 1897. It is a -story, Classical Revival style stone and granite building.  It features a large dome at the cross-axis of the gable roof, a paired column portico, and center pavilion and clock in the tympanum of the pediment.

It was listed on the National Register of Historic Places in 1985.  It is located in the West Washington Historic District.

References

See also 

 National Register of Historic Places listings in St. Joseph County, Indiana

County courthouses in Indiana
Courthouses on the National Register of Historic Places in Indiana
Neoclassical architecture in Indiana
Government buildings completed in 1897
Buildings and structures in South Bend, Indiana
National Register of Historic Places in St. Joseph County, Indiana
Historic district contributing properties in Indiana